Dennis Leigh may refer to:

Dennis Leigh (musician), real name of English musician John Foxx
Dennis Leigh (footballer) (born 1949), English footballer

See also
Dennis Lee (disambiguation)